Trdobojci is a settlement in the Haloze Hills in the Municipality of Videm in eastern Slovenia. The area traditionally belonged to the Styria region. It is now included in the Drava Statistical Region. It includes the hamlets of Spodnji Trdobojci and Zgornji Trdobojci.

Name
Trdobojci was attested in written sources in 1440 as  Terdowoycz. It is believed to be a plural demonym (via *Tvьrdobǫd-j-ьci) based on the Slavic personal name *Tvьrdobǫdъ, a clipped form of the older *Tvьrdobǫd-je (selo) 'Tvьrdobǫdъ's village'. The first element of the compound name, tvьrd, means 'hard', and the second, bǫdъ, is an imperative of the verb biti; the name Tvьrdobǫdъ thus meant 'be hard'.

Notable people
Notable people that were born or lived in Trdobojci include:
Dejan Zavec (born 1976), IBF Welterweight Champion

References

External links
Trdobojci on Geopedia

Populated places in the Municipality of Videm